Roy Kenneth Ackerman CBE (22 February 1942 – 16 May 2017) was an English restaurateur who owned the Gay Hussar and L'Etoile restaurants and published the Ackerman Guides and Egon Ronay restaurant guides.

Career
Ackerman started his first career with apprenticeship training in the kitchen and then opened his restaurant, Quincy's Bistro in 1975.

References

1942 births
2017 deaths
Businesspeople from Bristol
English restaurateurs
20th-century English businesspeople